Pravin Pote known as  P.R.Pote Patil is a member of Maharashtra Legislative Council, belonging to the Bharatiya Janata Party. He represents the  Amravati local body constituency. He was appointed Maharashtra's Minister of State in December, 2014 with the portfolio Industries and Mining, Environment, Public Works (excluding public undertaking). Later in the same month, he was also given responsibility of being guardian minister of Amravati district.

References

Members of the Maharashtra Legislative Council
Living people
People from Amravati district
Marathi politicians
Bharatiya Janata Party politicians from Maharashtra
Year of birth missing (living people)